Brackenborough is a hamlet in the civil parish of Brackenborough with Little Grimsby, in the East Lindsey district of Lincolnshire, England. At the census 2011 the population was included in the civil parish of Keddington.

Listed in the 1086 Domesday Book with 15 households, Brackenborough is now a deserted medieval village with earthworks visible to the north and south-east of Brackenborough Hall.

Brackenborough Hall is a Grade II* listed building dating from the 17th century, with later alterations and additions, and built of red brick. It is likely that it replaced an older building, and according to Lincolnshire Archives it was referred to in 1856 as "an ancient moated farmhouse". The Coach House has been converted into holiday apartments. In the grounds of the Hall is a Grade II listed Folly dating from 1863, built for James Robson, using building material from nearby Fotherby church, which was demolished the same year. Restoration of the folly was completed in 2022.

References

External links

Villages in Lincolnshire
East Lindsey District
Tourist attractions in Lincolnshire